Therubali railway station is a railway station on the East Coast Railway network in the state of Odisha, India. It serves Therubali village. Its code is THV. It has two platforms. Passenger, Express and Superfast trains halt at Therubali railway station.

Major trains

 Korba–Visakhapatnam Express
 Dhanbad–Alappuzha Express
 Bilaspur–Tirupati Express
 Samata Express
 Samaleshwari Express
 Sambalpur–Rayagada Intercity Express

See also
 Rayagada district

References

Railway stations in Rayagada district
Sambalpur railway division